Duarte, Duke of Guimarães (7 October 1515 in Lisbon – 20 September 1540 in Lisbon) was a Portuguese infante (prince); the sixth son of King Manuel I of Portugal and his wife Maria of Aragon.

Life 

He had as tutor André de Resende, who later wrote Duarte's biography. He also loved hunting and was quite a good musician.

In 1537 he married Isabella of Braganza, daughter of James, Duke of Braganza, who was dowried with the Dukedom of Guimarães in her own right. After the marriage, Infante Duarte became the 4th Duke of Guimarães.

This marriage produced three children:
Infanta Maria of Guimarães (1538–1577), married Alessandro Farnese, Duke of Parma and Piacenza.
Infanta Catarina, Duchess of Braganza (1540–1614), Duchess of Braganza, married to John, 6th Duke of Braganza, she was a claimant of the throne of Portugal in 1580 (''See: 1580 Portuguese succession crisis).
Infante Duarte, 5th Duke of Guimarães (1541–1576)

He is buried in the Monastery of Jerónimos in Lisbon.

Ancestry

See also 
Descendants of Manuel I of Portugal
List of Portuguese Dukedoms
André de Resende

References

Bibliography
 ”Nobreza de Portugal e do Brasil” – Vol. I, page 387. Published by Zairol Lda., Lisbon 1989.

Portuguese infantes
House of Aviz
1515 births
1540 deaths
104
People from Lisbon
16th-century Portuguese people
Sons of kings